The 2019 World Group II Play-offs was a Fed Cup tennis tournament consisting of four ties involving the losing nations of the World Group II and four nations from the three Zonal Group I competitions. 

At the time of the ties taking place, it was expected that the winners would secure a place in the World Group II for 2020, while the losers would be relegated to their respective zonal Group I, in accordance with the existing competition structure. 

However, the restructuring of the Fed Cup for 2020 announced on 27 June 2019 stipulated that the four winning nations will instead enter the 2020 Fed Cup Qualifiers. Of the four losing nations, the two with the highest ITF Fed Cup Nations Ranking (as of 22 April 2019) will also enter the 2020 Fed Cup Qualifiers, while only the remaining two losing nations will be relegated to their respective zonal Group I.

Seeding 
The seeding was announced on 11 February 2019.

<onlyinclude>

Seeds: 

Remaining nations:

Russia vs. Italy

Japan vs. Netherlands

Great Britain vs. Kazakhstan

Slovakia vs. Brazil

Status of losing teams

The fate of the four losing nations depended on their ITF Fed Cup Nations Ranking as of 22 April 2019.

References

External links 
 Fed Cup website

World Group II Play-offs